Freeze Dance is a 2021 Russian drama film directed by Nikolay Khomeriki. The film received the grand prize of the Kinotavr festival in 2021. It is scheduled to be theatrically released on November 4, 2021.

Plot 
The film tells about Kolya and Sasha, who are in love with each other, who are hiding in an old house in the forest. And suddenly they meet a mysterious married couple who are similar to them, and they want to understand themselves with their help.

Cast

References

External links 
 

2021 films
2020s Russian-language films
Russian drama films
2021 drama films